Adikavi Nannaya University (IAST: Ādikavi Nannaya Viśvavidyālayamu) is a state university located in Rajahmundry in Andhra Pradesh, India. It was established on 22 April 2006 through the Government of Andhra Pradesh Act No. 28 of 2006.

It is named after Nannayya, the first attested author of a text composed in the Telugu language. The university attends to the educational needs of both Godavari districts. Currently, all seventy-four post-graduate institutes as well as the 403 degree colleges located within the aforementioned districts maintain their government-mandated university affiliation with Adikavi Nannaya University. These colleges were previously affiliated with Andhra University.

The University also hosts four Constituent Colleges namely: University College of Arts and Commerce, University College of Education, University College of Engineering and University College of Science and Technology.

Adikavi Nannaya University has extension campus at Kakinada and Tadepalligudem.

The university initiated a program in Geo-Informatics and Petroleum Exploration, the first of its kind in Andhra Pradesh and one of the few in the country. In the second phase, keeping in view of the government policy of encouraging five-year integrated courses, the university designed and offered a new course in Mathematics and Computing, with the objective of providing trained programmes to the I.T. industry.

See also
 List of universities in India
 Universities and colleges in India
 Education in India

References

External links
Adikavi Nannaya University Website

Education in Rajahmundry
Educational institutions established in 2006
2006 establishments in Andhra Pradesh
Universities and colleges in East Godavari district
State universities in Andhra Pradesh